Gnodtke is a surname. Notable people with the surname include:

 Carl Gnodtke (1936–2000), American politician
 Eckhard Gnodtke (born 1958), German politician